An NRG file is a proprietary optical disc image file format originally created by Nero AG for the Nero Burning ROM utility. It is used to store disc images. Other than Nero Burning ROM, however, a variety of software titles can use these image files. For example, Alcohol 120%, or Daemon Tools can mount NRG files onto virtual drives for reading.

Contrary to popular belief, NRG files are not ISO images with a .nrg extension and a header attached. They can store audio tracks for Audio CDs, which ISO images cannot. Nero's NRG format is one of the few formats besides BIN/CUE, Alcohol 120%'s MDF/MDS and CloneCD's CCD/IMG/SUB disc image formats to support Mixed Mode CDs which contain audio CD tracks as well as data tracks.

File format

The file format specification below is unofficial and as such is lacking some data.  There may also be errors.

The NRG file format uses a variation of the Interchange File Format (IFF) and stores data in a chain of "chunks". All integer values are stored unsigned in big endian byte order.  Version 1 NRG format stores values as 32-bit integers.  Nero Burning ROM v5.5 introduced a new NRG file format, version 2, with support for 64-bit integers.

Header
The NRG format does not store its data as a header at the beginning of a file.  It is instead attached at the end of the file like a footer.  Image information is stored as a serialized chain of IFF chunks.  To get the offset of the first chunk one must read the NRG footer from the last 8 or 12 bytes of the file.

Chunks

(CUES) Cue Sheet
Available in all versions of NRG file format.

The CUEX chunk is the concatenation of fixed-size blocks, each one representing a cue point.

The index0 points are present even when they are identical to the index1 ones.  The index0 points in audio tracks are incorrect if Nero has been asked to record all the sub-channel data (in that case the sector size is 2448 bytes).  No index other than 0 or 1 has been encountered, although the chunk format allows for such cue points to be recorded; thus the number of cue blocks seems to be always 2*(#track + 1): two indices for each track, an index0 for the lead-in and an index1 for the lead-out.

(DAOI) DAO Information
Available in all versions of NRG file format.

DAOI chunks store disc at once sessions specific information in two parts.  The first part contains data that is specific for the session only.  The second part repeats track specific information (grey) once for each track.  Parse the SINF chunks to get the number of tracks for a specific session.

(CDTX) CD-text
Available in version 2 NRG file format.

The CDTX chunk is the concatenation of raw CD-text packs of 18 bytes each.

(ETNF) Extended Track Information
Available in all versions of NRG file format.

ETNF chunks are used to store track information for track at once sessions.  The data is repeated once for each track.  Parse the SINF chunks to get the number of tracks for a specific session.

(SINF) Session Information
Available in all versions of NRG file format.

Session information chunks should be used to quickly scan the image for session and track count.  SINF chunks are always listed in sequential order corresponding to the sessions order.  To get more details information about a specific session one must parse the corresponding DAOI or ETNF chunk.

(MTYP) Media Type?
Available in all versions of NRG file format.

This chunk and its use is unknown.  A value of 1 (big endian) was found in images of several CD (audio or data; CD-ROM or CD-R).

(DINF) Disc Information?
Found in TAO images in version 2 of NRG file format.  Found in DAO images in version of NRG file format only if Nero was asked not to close the disc.

This chunk and its use is unknown.

(TOCT) TOC T?
Found in TAO images in version 2 of NRG file format.

This chunk and its use is unknown.

(RELO)
Found in TAO images in version 2 of NRG file format.

This chunk and its use is unknown.

(END!) End of chain
Available in all versions of NRG file format.

End of chain chunk is signals that there are no more chunks to be read.

Archive formats
Disk images